Robert Eugene Wilson (born January 13, 1969) is an American former professional football player who was a running back for four seasons in the National Football League (NFL) with the Tampa Bay Buccaneers, Dallas Cowboys and Miami Dolphins. He was drafted by the Buccaneers in the third round of the 1991 NFL Draft. He played college football at Texas A&M University and attended Worthing High School in Houston, Texas.

References

External links
Just Sports Stats
College stats

Living people
1969 births
Players of American football from Houston
American football running backs
African-American players of American football
Texas A&M Aggies football players
Tampa Bay Buccaneers players
Dallas Cowboys players
Miami Dolphins players
21st-century African-American people
20th-century African-American sportspeople